Sarah Hale may refer to:
 Sarah Josepha Hale, American writer, activist and editor
 SS Sarah J. Hale, a Liberty ship
 Sarah Preston Hale, American diarist, translator, columnist and newspaper publisher